Liu Zhao may refer to:

 Emperor He of Han (79–105), emperor of the Chinese Han Dynasty
 Liu Zhao (footballer) (born 1985), Chinese footballer